The FIVB Volleyball World Grand Champions Cup is an international volleyball competition contested by the senior men's and women's national teams of the members of  (FIVB), the sport's global governing body. The tournament was created in 1993 after radical changes made on the biggest tournaments organised by the FIVB. The main goal was not to have a single year without two high-profile world-level volleyball competitions, alongside the pre-existing men's and women's world championship, men's and women's world cup and the volleyball tournament at the Olympic Games which are all quadrennial and the annual men's and women's Nations League.

The World Grand Champions Cup is therefore played quadrennially the year after the Olympic Games and is always hosted by the Japan Volleyball Association. It  does not give any points for the World Ranking.

Brazil has been the most successful team in the men's tournament, having won five of the seven editions. Brazil has also finished runners-up to Cuba and Italy in the only two occasions claimed by other national teams. The women's tournament history is more balanced with Brazil and
China having won the tournament twice, while Cuba, Italy, and Russia have won one title each.

History

Origins
The World Grand Champions Cup was created in 1993 after radical changes made on the biggest tournaments organised by the FIVB. The main goal was not to have a single year without a world FIVB competition. This is the only FIVB tournament that doesn't give FIVB points for the world ranking.

Winners
Brazil has been the most successful team with the men's team winning five and the women's team two titles.

Competition formula
The World Grand Champions Cup has always had the same formula since the first edition:

 The competition takes place in Japan.
 Six teams participate in each event: host nation, four continental champions and one wild card.
 Japan is always pre-qualified as the host nation.
 Four continental champions from continents whose teams reached the highest ranking at the preceding Olympic Games.
 The remaining team participates through a wild card granted by the FIVB.
 A round robin format is used for this competition.
 Final standings are calculated by usual volleyball criteria: until 2013 match points, numbers of matches won, sets ratio (the total number of sets won divided by the total number of sets lost), points ratio, direct confrontation; since 2017 the first criterion became the number of matches won, followed by match points, sets ratio etc.

Results summary

Men

Women

Medals summary

Men

Women

All-time team records

(Based on W=2 pts and D=1 pts)

MVP by edition

Men
1993 – 
1997 – 
2001 – 
2005 – 
2009 – 
2013 – 
2017 –

Women
1993 – 
1997 – 
2001 – 
2005 – 
2009 – 
2013 – 
2017 –

See also

Volleyball at the Summer Olympics
FIVB Volleyball Men's World Championship
FIVB Volleyball Women's World Championship
FIVB Volleyball Men's World Cup
FIVB Volleyball Women's World Cup
FIVB Volleyball World League
FIVB World Grand Prix
FIVB Volleyball Men's Nations League
FIVB Volleyball Women's Nations League
List of indoor volleyball world medalists

External links
Official website of the FIVB

 
FIVB Volleyball World Grand Champions Cup
FIVB Volleyball World Grand Champions Cup
FIVB Volleyball World Grand Champions Cup
 
 
International volleyball competitions hosted by Japan
Quadrennial sporting events